The Korea Volleyball Federation (KOVO) (hangul : 한국배구연맹) is the governing body for the professional competitions of volleyball in South Korea. It runs the V-League and KOVO Cup.

See also
V-League
 KOVO Cup

External links
KOVO official website 

Volleyball
Volleyball in South Korea
Volleyball organizations